The Navotas City Council is Navotas's Sangguniang Panlungsod or legislature. It is composed of 14 councilors, with 12 councilors elected from Navotas' six councilor districts (coextensive with the Legislative district of Navotas) and two councilors elected from the ranks of barangay (neighborhood) chairmen and the Sangguniang Kabataan (SK; youth councils). The presiding officer of the council is the Vice Mayor, who is elected citywide.

Membership
Each of Navotas' two councilor districts elects six councilors to the council. In plurality-at-large voting, a voter may vote up to six candidates, with the candidates having the six highest number of votes being elected. In addition, the barangay chairmen and the SK chairmen throughout the city elect amongst themselves their representatives to the council. Hence, there are 14 councilors.

City council elections are synchronized with other elections in the country. Elections are held every first Monday of May every third year since 1992.

Current members
As the presiding officer, te Vice Mayor can only vote to break ties.
The parties as stated in the 2022 election.

1st District
 Edgardo Maño (Navoteño)
 Reynaldo Monroy (Navoteño)
 Alvin Jason Nazal (Navoteño)
 Richard San Juan (Navoteño)
 Lance Angelo Santiago	(Navoteño)
 Arvie John Vicencio (Navoteño)

2nd District
 Neil Adrian Cruz (Navoteño)
 Clint Geronimo (Navoteño)
 Emil Justin Angelo Gino-gino (Navoteño)
 Analiza Lupisan (Navoteño)
 Ron Hansel Miguel Naval (Navoteño)	
 Cesar Justine Santos (Navoteño)

Sectoral Representatives

References

City councils in the Philippines
Politics of Navotas